Pocket God is a simulation game developed by Bolt Creative, in which the player manipulates an island and its inhabitants. It was released for the iPad, iPhone, and iPod Touch on January 9, 2009, and released for Verizon Wireless on September 1, 2010, Android on December 1, 2010, and Windows Phone on December 4, 2010. The Facebook version was released December 23, 2010.

Gameplay 

The player takes the role of an omnipotent being who rules over an island and controls everything. The primitive islanders, known as Pygmies, are subject to the player's god powers. These range from benevolent powers, such as giving the islanders a fishing rod, to destructive, such as summoning a hurricane, or simply entertaining, such as levitating the Pygmies. Built-in features of iOS, the iPad, and iPod Touch are used, such as the accelerometer to simulate gravity and earthquakes. Most of these features can be toggled on the game's menu bar. The "March of the Fire Ants" update also added a new feature known as OpenFeint, where players can access chat rooms, leaderboards, achievements, and announcements during gameplay. 

One of the game's most notable features is the regular release of updates introducing additional content. The episodes A New Home, Dead Pygmy Walking, and The Pyg Chill added additional islands to the game, which can be toggled from the menu bar. The Fun n' Games until A Pygmy Gets Hurt update added mini-games for consecutive coconut bounces, consecutive shark snaps, underwater skewer, pygmy bowling, and hurricane zaps. The Ooga Jump update added the first crossover minigame, Ooga Jump, which was followed by a Harbor Master crossover. In the Idle Hands 2: Caught With Your Pants Down update more idle features were added to the Pygmies when they are not in use. Also, Buddy Challenges were implemented with OpenFeint. In the Good Will Haunting update, a downloadable content (DLC) store was added with changeable skins for the T-Rex. Other packs, such as the Halloween, holiday, and alien themes, have since been added.

Pocket God was updated often with new 'episodes', a themed update that adds new features to the Pocket God world, such as new islands, items, or minigames. In December 2012, it was announced Episode 47: Apocalypse Ow! would be the game's final major update. 

A bonus episode, Episode 48: Call of Booty, released to the App Store on November 27, 2014.

Facebook version 

A Facebook version of Pocket God was released on December 23, 2010, citing more features from the mobile versions of the game. It was co-developed by Frima studio and discontinued in 2015.

Comics

Releases 

Pocket God was released for iOS devices on January 9, 2009. According to the official Pocket God blog, Bolt Creative have "about ten ideas for standalone Pocket God games". They also noted that even if sequels are developed, Pocket God will still receive updates, but at a slower rate.
A digital comic-book tie-in is currently being published; the first issue was released on August 3, 2010, through  and Ape Entertainment.

Pocket God is slowly being released on non-Apple platforms. A version was released for Verizon Wireless cellphones on September 1, 2010. An Android port (published by ngmoco) was released on December 1, 2010. A Facebook port (co-developed by Frima studio) moved to closed Beta on the same day.

Pocket God is also on Windows Phone. The creators stated that they would be releasing Pocket God: Journey to Uranus exclusively for the iPad, and that it would include minigames allowing the pygmies to travel to other planets, it was scheduled for release in Fall 2010, but was since delayed. According to the developers regularly updated blog, the app was released on December 16, 2010. JTU has since been updated in the episodic style of Pocket God, and now features four areas (Earth, space, Uranus, Mercury). In Episode 4: Quantum Entanglement, JTU was made compatible with all iOS devices.

Reception 

Pocket God has received positive reviews. iTunes App Reviews gave the game 5 out of 5 stars. AppStruck gave the game 5 out of 5 stars referring to the game as "endlessly amusing and is an easy way to completely lose track of time". iPhone App Reviews gave the updated version of the game 4.8 out of 5 having given the original version 3.92 out of 5. Appvee gave the game 4 out of 5 after episode 11 was released, having originally given the game 1.8 out of 5.

Controversy 

The game was subject to controversy when some Pacific Islanders and anthropologists protested to Apple Inc. claiming the game was racist. The game's creators defended the game, saying "it depicts no specific race or nationality". Pocket God programmer Dave Castelnuovo got in touch with one of the original Pacific Islanders and came up with some compromises: The islanders would be called Oogs instead of Pygmies, and the Moai statue would be replaced with a statue of an Octopus God. On May 27, 2009, Castelnuovo announced that the characters would no longer be called Oogs, as 'Pygmies' was a more suitable name, and did not actually cause any friction between Pacific Islanders.

In other apps 

As part of the effort to promote Pocket God, the developers engaged in cross-promotion with a number of other developers. This promotion saw a number of updates where new themed features were added to "Pocket God" and in return the related apps added Pocket God themed updates.

Three apps have featured the game as a direct result of cross-promotion. The addition of Doodler to Pocket God resulted in a new version of Doodle Jump being released on May 22, 2009, which allowed users to play as a Pygmy from Pocket God. To unlock the Pygmy, players must change the high score name to one of the characters from Pocket God: Ooga, Booga, Nooby, Dooby, Klik or Klak.

The second crossover was with Harbor Master on August 8, 2009, where Pygmies replaced the normal boats in the path drawing game.

The final cross promotion saw a new test added to "Moron Test" with a Pocket God theme to it, which characters from the Moron Test were featured on a new island and minigame within the Pocket God universe.

There are reports of seeing a pygmy in the app uggles as a playable character.

Two other apps have featured the famous Pocket God characters within their games. The Creeps released an update allowing pygmies as characters. Also Trenches added to their "Zombie Horde" mode by allowing Zombie Pygmies to replace the Zombie Germans as the antagonists within the game.

Announced in 2015 was the spin-off game Pocket God vs Desert Ashes.

References

External links 

IOS games
God games
2009 video games
Video games developed in the United States
Android (operating system) games
Windows Mobile games
Windows Phone games
Facebook games
Single-player video games
Frima Studio games